Indirect presidential elections were held in Turkey on 22 May 1950. This was the first time candidates from other parties than the ruling CHP were admitted. 453 out of 487 members of the Grand National Assembly participated in the elections, which were held as required by law immediately after the election of the members of the ninth parliament. Democrat Party chairman Celâl Bayar was elected president with 387 votes in the first round. Then president and CHP Chairman İsmet İnönü lost the elections with 66 votes.

Results

References

Presidential elections in Turkey
President